Reinhard von Rüppurr (or Rippur) was the Prince-Bishop of Worms from 1504 to 1523.  He was appointed bishop on 9 February 1504 and resigned ca. 1523.

References

Roman Catholic bishops of Worms